Mezia is a genus in the Malpighiaceae, a family of about 75 genera of flowering plants in the order Malpighiales. Mezia comprises 10 species of woody vines and lianas native to South America, with one species (M. includens) extending into Panama.

Species

External links

Malpighiaceae Malpighiaceae - description, taxonomy, phylogeny, and nomenclature
Mezia

Malpighiaceae
Malpighiaceae genera